Paraphilaenus is a genus of true bugs belonging to the family Aphrophoridae.

The species of this genus are found in Central Asia.

Species
Species:
 Paraphilaenus notatus (Mulsant & Rey, 1855)

References

Aphrophoridae